Steve Dobrogosz (born 26 January 1956 in Bellefonte, Pennsylvania) is an American composer, songwriter and pianist.

Dobrogosz is the son of Walter Dobrogosz and Donna Bartone and grew up in Raleigh, North Carolina and attended Jesse O. Sanderson High School. He studied at the Berklee College of Music in Boston, Massachusetts, and afterwards moved to Stockholm, Sweden in 1978, where he began recording and performing. Dobrogosz continues to reside in Stockholm.

Dobrogosz's over 1500 compositions span several genres, including jazz, pop, and classical. He has written a number of popular choral compositions, including Mass (1992) which has been performed in over 40 countries.

He has collaborated with singers such as Radka Toneff, Jeanette Lindström, Berit Andersson and more recently with Anna Christoffersson. His albums with Christoffersson, It's Always You and Rivertime, were nominated for the Grammis Award in the jazz album category. His 1982 album with Radka Toneff, Fairy Tales, was named best Norwegian album of all time in a 2012 Norwegian artist poll.

He is married to Swedish flutist Katarina Fritzén. They have three sons, including Jonathan Fritzén, a contemporary jazz pianist and multi-instrumentalist.

Discography
Songs (1980), with Steve Dobrogosz Trio
Confessions (1981) 
Fairytales (1982), with Radka Toneff
The Child's Gift (1986), with Steve Dobrogosz Vocal Ensemble
Pianopieces (1994), solo, duets with Petur Östlund
Duckwalk (1996), Steve Dobrogosz Quartet
Mass and chamber music (1997), with St. Jacob's Chamber Choir
Ebony Moon (1998), solo piano 
Best of Dobrogosz and Andersson (1999), with Berit Andersson
Feathers (2000), with Jeanette Lindstrom
Requiem/Te Deum (2004), with St. Jacob's Chamber Choir
It's Always You (2006), with Anna Christoffersson
When Lilacs Last In The Dooryard Bloom'd (2006), with St. Jacob's Chamber Choir
Rivertime (2008), with Anna Christoffersson
My Rose (2009), a Shakespeare oratorio
Stream (2009), solo piano
Poems (2007), with Annika Skoglund
Golden Slumbers (2009), Steve Dobrogosz plays Lennon–McCartney 
Your Songs (2010 ), Steve Dobrogosz plays Elton John
Covers (2010), with Anna Christoffersson
World (2010), pianos
Celebratory Music (2010), for pipe organ, with Andrew Canning
Charts (2011), solo piano
Christmas Cantata (2012), Linköpings Akademiskakören
The Water of Life (2013), solo piano
Forest (2014), solo piano
Dreams (2014), solo piano
Free Country (2015), solo piano
Sequencer (2015), 43 basement tapes
Bara (2015), with Chikako Hino
The Wild Bird Flies (2016), piano trio
Stabat Mater (2016), Hiroshima Chuo Choir, Nozomi Terasawa
Silencer (2016), solo piano
The B3z (2019 reissue), soul/jazz band
Anthology (2017), with Berit Andersson
Sha-La (2017), Steve Dobrogosz Vocal Ensemble
Forgotten Man (2019 reissue), Americana piano
Candlelight (2017 additional material), solo piano
The Earth Is Singing (2018), with SYC Ensemble Singers, Jennifer Tham
Rocking Chair (2019), rock piano
Mood (2020), chill
The Gospel Chord (2021)
Yuletide (2022), Christmas piano
Almost Live (2022), with Anna Christoffersson

References

External links
 Steve Dobrogosz official homepage
 Steve Dobrogosz YouTube playlist

1956 births
Living people
20th-century American pianists
20th-century American male musicians
21st-century classical pianists
21st-century American pianists
21st-century American male musicians
American jazz composers
American jazz pianists
American classical pianists
American male jazz composers
American male pianists
Jazz musicians from North Carolina
Male classical pianists
Musicians from Raleigh, North Carolina
Jesse O. Sanderson High School alumni